Jean Baptiste Emeneya Mubiala Kwamambu (November 23, 1956 – February 13, 2014) was a Congolese singer best known as King Kester Emeneya.

He was born in Kikwit within the Democratic Republic of the Congo. While being a student of political science at the University of Lubumbashi in 1977, King Kester joined the band Viva La Musica. After achieving success with several popular songs, he became the most popular African singer in the 1980s and created his own band, called "Victoria Eleison", on December 24, 1982.

Emeneya Djo Kester was innovative with his music. His music was innovative and brand new. He was the first musician in the sub-Saharan region of Africa who initiated music programming and used synthesizers in his Nzinzi album, which copies was sold worldwide in 1987. He introduced African music to international audience by combining African motives with programming and Rhythm and Blues. After years of success, in 1993 he released Every Body distributed by Sonodisc. Every Body achieved success internationally. In 1997, after 7 years of absence, King Kester returned to Congo. Nearly 80,000 people attended the first concert after his return, which was a record-setting feat according to the Congolese media. Emeneya is considered to be the greatest singer Africa ever had. He has more than 1000 songs to his credit and has performed on all continents. He initiated LA SAPE movement and promoted designers like Gianni Versace, Masatomo, JM Weston etc. Emeneya was also the actor in the movie "Les habits neufs du Gouverneur". His interest and innovation did not only end in music, King Kester Emeneya was an advocate of the African people and a fighter of civil rights. He repudiated apartheid in South Africa and released a song supporting Nelson Mandela while praising his cause and morale in his album Success Fous. During his last tour in the United States while performing in Los Angeles in 2007, he praised the US for making significant progress on justice equality and race. Emeneya was involved in charitable activities through his foundation. He was concerned about the level of poverty in the continent and wanted to make sure that governments in different African nations managed enough efforts to improve the social lives of their citizens. King Kester Emeneya was a huge fan of Barack Obama, Bill Clinton, John F. Kennedy, Dwight Eisenhower, Franklin Roosevelt and Abraham Lincoln. Emeneya has praised President Obama in a number of his interviews for being an advocate of the poor. Emeneya performed a concert in Kinshasa in 2009 to help celebrate Obama's inauguration as the first US black president. A friend of the United States, he has helped the US Embassy in Kinshasa celebrate July 4 several times, especially during the tenure of U.S Ambassador Aubrey Hooks. King Kester Emeneya was also grateful to President Bush for his HIV and malaria initiatives in Africa. He released his album Le Jour Le Plus Long D-Day (The Longest Day) in 2007 in order to praise the US invasion of Normandy during World War II in France. One of his sons is named after Franklin Roosevelt.

From 1991 until his death in Paris in February 2014, King Kester Emeneya lived mostly in France with his family.  Emeneya's funeral was the largest in the history of Congo and was broadcast live on all channels in Congo and many others around the world. On April 6, 2014, Pope Francis welcomed Emeneya's family to Vatican City to express his support. On March 2, 2014, Emeneya was awarded the presidential civic medal posthumously by President Joseph Kabila for his service and extraordinary contribution to Congolese nation and music. This is the highest civilian award to be bestowed by a Congolese president. The award is given by a presidential decree. King Kester Emeneya was also awarded the title of Ambassador of Peace posthumously by the University of Birmingham in the United Kingdom on February 21, 2015.

On April 25, 2014, a tribute concert was held in his hometown of Kikwit ended in disaster, and at least forty people in the stadium lost their lives in a stampede following a power failure.

Discography
Milena (1977)
Teint de Bronze (1978)
Ndako ya Ndele (1979)
Musheni (1979)
Kayole (1979)
Fleur d'ete (1978)
Ngonda (1979)
Dikando (1980)
La Runda (1980)
Ata Nkale (1979)
Dembela (1981)
Naya (1982)
Ngabelo(1982)
Okosi ngai mfumu(1983)
Surmenage(1984)
Kimpiatu(1985)
Willo mondo(1985)
Wabelo(1986)
Manhattan(1986)
Deux Temps(1987)
Nzinzi (1987)
Mokusa(1990)
Dikando Remix (1991)
Polo Kina (1992)
Every Body (1993)
Live in Japan (1991)
Every Body (Remix) (1995)
Pas de contact (1995)
Succès Fous (1997)
Mboka Mboka (1998)
Never Again Plus jamais (1999)
Longue Histoire (Volume 1 & 2) (2000)
Live au Zénith de Paris (2001)
Live à l'Olympia (Bruno COQUATRIX) de Paris (2002)
Rendre à César ... ... ce qui est à César (2002)
Nouvel ordre (2002)
Le Jour Le Plus Long (2007)
DVD Olympia Bruno COQUATRIX live 2008

References

External links 
 King Kester Emeneya's website

1956 births
2014 deaths
20th-century Democratic Republic of the Congo male singers
People from Kikwit
Democratic Republic of the Congo expatriates in France
21st-century Democratic Republic of the Congo people